Tatum Airport  is a public use airport located three nautical miles (6 km) east of the central business district of Tatum, a town in Lea County, New Mexico, United States. Currently owned by the Town of Tatum, it was formerly owned by the New Mexico Department of Transportation.

Facilities and aircraft 
Tatum Airport covers an area of 320 acres (129 ha) at an elevation of 3,986 feet (1,215 m) above mean sea level. It has two runways with asphalt surfaces. Runway 12/30, the only active runway, is 2,920 by 60 feet (890 x 18 m). Runway 5/23 is closed indefinitely and measures 2,990 by 75 feet (911 x 23 m). For the 12-month period ending April 7, 2008, the airport had 240 general aviation aircraft operations, an average of 20 per month.

References

External links 
 Aerial image as of November 1997 from USGS The National Map
 

Airports in New Mexico
Transportation in Lea County, New Mexico